Batorampon Point is the westernmost point of the island of Mindanao in the Philippines and has been named so since the mid-19th century. The rocky cliff, located within the limits of the City of Zamboanga, was previously known as Batalampon Point, becoming Batorampon Point in the 1940s.

The peak was not named in the 1940s topography map of the region by the U.S. Army's topographic engineering agency, the Army Map Service. When it was named Batorampon Point is not known.

References 

Headlands of the Philippines
Geography of Zamboanga City
Landforms of Zamboanga del Sur